"The Female of the Species" is a poem by Rudyard Kipling originally published in 1911. Its title and refrain ("The female of the species is more deadly than the male.") have inspired the titles of numerous subsequent works (see The Female of the Species (disambiguation)).

Summary
Kipling begins the poem by illustrating the greater deadliness of female bears and cobras compared to their male counterparts, and by stating that early Jesuit missionaries to North America were more frightened of Native women than male warriors. He continues by giving his thoughts on how male and female humans differ and why the female "must be deadlier than the male," saying that females can be single-minded - often to the point of being dangerous - because they were made for the supremely important purpose of perpetuating the species. An example is contained in these lines: "She who faces Death by torture for each life beneath her breast may not deal in doubt or pity, must not swerve for fact or jest. These be purely male diversions, not in these her honour dwells."

Some readers may think Kipling's description of the sometimes stubborn nature of women that makes them good mothers and wives is stating that they are therefore unsuitable to hold leadership positions in the broader community. However, careful analysis offers another iteration: Kipling writes that "man, the coward" has a "timid heart," and so may choose to exclude women from leadership positions out of fear ("fear, or foolishness, impels him"), but instead should appreciate their fortitude, strength, and bravery, and respect and appreciate the differences between the sexes.

References in other media
"The Female of the Species" and its refrain have been referenced in numerous other works:
 In 1928, the Bulldog Drummond story "The Female of the Species" may have lifted the title. This story was adapted as the 1967 European spy movie Deadlier Than the Male. Scott Walker of The Walker Brothers wrote and performed the accompanying musical theme and scored a minor hit on the UK Singles Chart in 1966.
 A 1946 novel by James Hadley Chase was titled More Deadly Than The Male. Another novel, written by Mindy McGinnis, is titled “The Female of the Species.”
 In 1984, Off Centaur Publications released an audio tape cassette album titled The Horse-Tamer's Daughter, which featured a song based on the poem set to music by Leslie Fish and performed by Julia Ecklar. In 1998, the song was nominated for a Pegasus Award for "Best Adaptation" by a ballot of science fiction and fantasy fans, conducted by the committee of the annual  Ohio Valley Filk Fest (OVFF), a filk music convention.
 It is referenced by the character of Col. Mustard, played by Martin Mull, in the 1985 film Clue.
 It seems to be referred to by the abbreviated form "The F of the S is much more D than the M" in episode 3 of series 1 of the TV series "Jeeves and Wooster".
 In 1996, the English pop group Space released "Female of the Species".
 The title was lifted in 2006 for Joanna Murray-Smith's satirical play The Female of the Species.
 The title of the poem is also used as the name of a character in Garth Ennis' 2006 comic book The Boys. As a possible other reference to Kipling's work, the character is depicted as a feral child

References

Poetry by Rudyard Kipling